Michał Pytkowski (born April 20, 1989 in Warsaw) is a Polish footballer who currently plays for Nielba Wągrowiec on loan from Widzew Łódź.

Career

Club
In July 2011, he was loaned to Pelikan Łowicz.

References

External links
 

1989 births
Living people
Polish footballers
Association football goalkeepers
Sokół Pniewy players
Widzew Łódź players
Footballers from Warsaw